The 1976 United States presidential election in Rhode Island took place on November 2, 1976, as part of the 1976 United States presidential election. Voters chose four representatives, or electors, to the Electoral College, who voted for president and vice president.

Rhode Island was won by Jimmy Carter (D–Georgia), with 55.36% of the popular vote. Carter defeated incumbent President Gerald Ford (R–Michigan), who finished with 44.08% of the popular vote. No third-party candidate received any votes.

Jimmy Carter went on to become the 39th president of the United States.

Results

By county

See also
 United States presidential elections in Rhode Island

References

Rhode Island
1976
1976 Rhode Island elections